Pietro Citati (20 February 1930 – 28 July 2022) was an Italian writer and literary critic.

He was born in Florence. He wrote critical biographies of Goethe, Alexander the Great, Kafka and Marcel Proust as well as a short memoir on his thirty-year friendship with Italo Calvino.

In Kafka, Pietro Citati had the great writer declare: "'I am like you, I am a man like you, I suffer and rejoice as you do, like a meticulous and buoyant angel, a being who lives far away in a world that did not belong even to him."

From 1973 to 1988, he contributed to the cultural section of Corriere della Sera and was the literary critic for la Repubblica between 1988 and 2011, before returning to write for Corriere della Sera.

He died at his villa in Roccamare, in the municipality of Castiglione della Pescaia, on 28 July 2022 at the age of 92.

Bibliography 
 Goethe Dial Press (1974)
 Alexander the Great 1974
 Tolstoy Schocken (1986)
 Kafka, Milano, Rizzoli, 1987
 La colomba pugnalata 1995
 La mente colorata 2002
 La morte della farfalla 2006

Filmography 
Dans la peau d'Italo Calvino (2012), documentary by Damian Pettigrew with Pietro Citati and Neri Marcorè in the role of Italo Calvino

References

External links 
 



1930 births
2022 deaths
20th-century Italian writers
Italian literary critics
Italian male non-fiction writers
Strega Prize winners
La Repubblica people
Scuola Normale Superiore di Pisa alumni
University of Pisa alumni
Writers from Florence
Knights Grand Cross of the Order of Merit of the Italian Republic
Grand Officers of the Order of Merit of the Italian Republic